Conus lugubris is a species of sea snail, a marine gastropod mollusk in the family Conidae, the cone snails and their allies.

Like all species within the genus Conus, these snails are predatory and venomous. They are capable of "stinging" humans, therefore live ones should be handled carefully or not at all.

Description
The size of the shell varies between 10 mm and 24 mm. The shell is finely striated, rudely ridged at the base with the ridges few and distant. The spire is conspicuously grooved. Its color is chocolate-black, obscurely reticulated here and there with numerous aggregated small white spots.

Distribution
This species occurs only on the north coast of the island of São Vicente, Cape Verde.

References

 Rolán E., 2005. Malacological Fauna From The Cape Verde Archipelago. Part 1, Polyplacophora and Gastropoda
  Puillandre N., Duda T.F., Meyer C., Olivera B.M. & Bouchet P. (2015). One, four or 100 genera? A new classification of the cone snails. Journal of Molluscan Studies. 81: 1–23

External links
 The Conus Biodiversity website
 

lugubris
Gastropods described in 1849
Gastropods of Cape Verde